Jakobselva may refer to two different rivers in northern Norway:

 Jakobselva (Sør-Varanger), a river in Sør-Varanger municipality in Finnmark county, Norway
 Jakobselva (Vadsø), a river in Vadsø municipality in Finnmark county, Norway